The Union of Women of Russia (Russian: Союз женщин России (СЖР); known before 1991 as the Soviet Women's Committee) was a women's political organisation in Russia. Its leader was Alevtina Fedulova.

In 1993, it was the dominant force in the merger of the Association of Women Entrepreneurs and the Union of Navy Women to form the Women of Russia political bloc.

Notes

References

Defunct political parties in Russia
Feminist parties in Europe
Feminist parties in Asia